Dan Crummell  is a Canadian politician in Newfoundland and Labrador, who represented the district of St. John's West in Newfoundland and Labrador House of Assembly from 2011 to 2015, as a member of the Progressive Conservative Party. In a 1995 by-election and the 1996 provincial election, Crummell was the Progressive Conservative candidate in the district of Gander.

Background
Crummell was raised in the town of Gander in central Newfoundland. He moved to St. John's to pursue his post-secondary education at Memorial University of Newfoundland (MUN), and completed an Arts degree with a major in Political Science and minors in English and History. During his time at MUN, Crummell served as the Executive Vice-President and later President of Memorial University's Council of the Students’ Union. Following his graduation he worked in sales and marketing with Molson Canada. He spent 25 years with the company, and spent 10 years as the Regional Sales Manager for Newfoundland and Labrador.

Politics
Crummell first sought political office when he ran as the Progressive Conservative Party (PC) candidate in an October 10, 1995 by-election in the district of Gander. The by-election was called following the resignation of Liberal cabinet minister Winston Baker, who had held the seat since 1985. PC Party leader Lynn Verge admitted that it would be a tremendous upset if her party was able to take the seat from the Liberals in the by-election. On election night Liberal candidate Gary Vey defeated Crummell by just 46 votes. A provincial election was called only months later for February 22, 1996, and Crummell once again ran as the candidate for the PC Party in Gander. Gander mayor Sandra Kelly, who lost the Liberal nomination to Vey for the October by-election, was now the Liberal candidate for the district. Kelly defeated Crummell by over 700 votes, and the Liberal Party were re-elected to a majority government.

Government backbencher
On July 18, 2011, Crummell defeated Glenn Moores to become the Progressive Conservative candidate in the district of St. John's West, for that year's provincial election. In the October 11, election Crummell defeated New Democratic Party candidate Chris Pickard by less than 300 votes, while the Liberal candidate finished a distant third. On October 24, 2012, Crummell was appointed Parliamentary Secretary to the Minister of Advanced Education and Skills (Apprenticeship and Labour Market).

In a November 2012, radio interview Crummell stated that he thought federal Intergovernmental Affairs minister Peter Penashue should do the honourable thing and resign from cabinet. Penashue, Newfoundland and Labrador's representative in the federal cabinet, was facing allegations of improper campaign spending and donations. Hours after Crummell made the comments on CBC's radio program On Point, he sent out an email saying that he was unaware that an official agent had been appointed to look into the issues with Penashue and that he thought it was important for the province to have representation in the federal cabinet. Five months later Penashue resigned as minister of Intergovernmental Affairs and as the member of Parliament for Labrador, and announced he would run in a by-election after it was confirmed he had accepted ineligible donations in the 2011 election. He was later defeated in a by-election.

Cabinet Minister
On October 9, 2013 Premier Kathy Dunderdale appointed Crummell Minister of Service NL, in a major shuffle that saw him and MHA Steve Kent enter cabinet. Along with being named Minister of Service NL, Crummell was also Minister Responsible for the Workplace Health, Safety and Compensation Commission, Minister Responsible for the Office of the Chief Information Officer, and Minister Responsible for the Government Purchasing Agency.

On July 17, 2014, Crummell was appointed Minister of Municipal and Intergovernmental Affairs, Minister Responsible for Fire and Emergency Services, and Registrar General.

On September 30, 2014, Crummell was appointed Minister of Environment and Conservation, Minister Responsible for the Multi-Materials Stewardship Board and Minister Responsible for Climate Change and Energy Efficiency.

In the 2015 election, Crummell was defeated by Liberal Siobhán Coady.

2015-present
In 2018, following the election of Ches Crosbie as PC Leader; Crosbie appointed Crummell as his Chief of Staff in the Opposition Office. Crummell was replaced as Chief of Staff by former MP Bill Matthews that October.

Electoral record

|-

|-

|NDP
|Chris Pickard
|align="right"|1,729
|align="right"|37.4
|align="right"|
|-

|}

}

|-
|}

}

|NDP
|Roy Locke
|align="right"|268
|align="right"|5.3%
|
|-
|}

References

External links
 Dan Crummell's PC Party biography
 Dan Crummell's Personal Website
 

Progressive Conservative Party of Newfoundland and Labrador MHAs
Living people
People from Gander, Newfoundland and Labrador
Politicians from St. John's, Newfoundland and Labrador
Members of the Executive Council of Newfoundland and Labrador
21st-century Canadian politicians
Year of birth missing (living people)